Robert Spencer, 1st Baron Spencer of Wormleighton KG (157025 October 1627) was an English nobleman, peer, politician, landowner, and MP from the Spencer family.

Life 
He was born in Althorp, Northamptonshire, the son of John Spencer and Mary, daughter of Sir Robert Catlyn.

Spencer held the office of Member of Parliament for Brackley from 1597 to 1598. He was the Commissioner for Musters for Northamptonshire in 1600 and Sheriff of Northamptonshire for 1601–02. He was invested as a Knight, Order of the Garter in 1601.

Anne of Denmark and Prince Henry came to Althorp on Sunday 25 June 1603 from Dingley. Spencer welcomed them with a performance The Entertainment at Althorp, written by Ben Jonson.

Robert Spencer was created 1st Baron Spencer of Wormleighton (in the Peerage of England) on 21 July 1603. On 5 August 1607 he was nominated with Sir Ralph Winwood joint representative of England at The Hague in the negotiations for peace between Spain and the United Netherlands.

Family 
On 15 February 1587 he married Margaret Willoughby the daughter of Sir Francis Willoughby and Elizabeth Lyttelton. Robert had seven children by Margaret.

Children 
 Sir Henry Spencer (1587-1632) married Lady Joan Church, daughter of Sir William Church
 Mary Spencer (christened 24 August 1588 – 14 July 1658) married Richard Anderson
 Elizabeth Spencer (christened 30 November 1589 – 19 November 1618) married George Fane
 Sir John Spencer (6 December 1590 – 16 August 1610)
 William Spencer, 2nd Baron Spencer of Wormleighton (christened 4 January 1592 – 19 December 1636) married Lady Penelope Wriothesley
 Sir Richard Spencer (christened 21 October 1593 – 1 November 1661) married Mary Sandys
 Sir Edward Spencer (christened 2 March 1594 – 16 February 1655/1656) married Margaret Goldsmith
 Margaret Spencer (14 August 1597 – 6 December 1613)

References 

 
 thepeerage Accessed 24 November 2008
 Family search Retrieved 4 October 2010

1570 births
1627 deaths
Robert
Barons in the Peerage of England
Knights of the Garter
High Sheriffs of Northamptonshire
English MPs 1597–1598
17th-century English nobility
16th-century English nobility
Peers of England created by James I